Country Squire is the third studio album by American country musician Tyler Childers. Recorded at the Butcher Shoppe in Nashville, the album was produced by Sturgill Simpson and was released on August 2, 2019, through Childers' own Hickman Holler label.

The album received a Metacritic rating of 85 based on six reviews, indicating universal acclaim.

Commercial performance

Country Squire debuted at No. 1 on Billboard's Top Country Albums and American/Folk Albums, his first on No. 1 on these charts.  It sold 24,000 in traditional albums, 32,000 in equivalent album units in the first week.  As of March 2020, the album has sold 65,400 copies in the United States.

Critical reception 
Country Squire was met with immediate critical acclaim. Writing for Pitchfork Magazine, Stephen Deusner remarks that "[Childers] has a remarkable facility with telling details, which pepper Country Squire as vividly they did his 2017 breakout Purgatory."

Accolades 
The penultimate track of the album, "All Your'n", was nominated for Best Solo Country Performance at the 2019 Grammy Awards, but lost out to Willie Nelson and his song "Ride Me Back Home".

Track listing

Personnel
From Country Squire liner notes.

Musicians
 Tyler Childers - vocals (all tracks), acoustic guitar (all tracks), hand claps (8)
 Stuart Duncan - fiddle (all tracks), mandolin (2, 4, 7, 9), banjo (5, 9), hand claps (8)
 Miles Miller - drums (all tracks except 9), background vocals (all tracks except 9), washboard (4), hand claps (8)
 Russ Pahl - electric guitar (1, 3, 4, 5, 6, 8), pedal steel guitar (1, 3, 7, 8), baritone guitar (1, 4), Dobro (2, 7), classical guitar (7), acoustic guitar (8, 9), Jew's harp (2), mandolin (5), hand claps (8)
 David Roe - bass guitar (all tracks), hand claps (8)
 Mike Rojas - piano (1, 3, 4, 6), accordion (2), Hammond B-3 organ (3, 5, 6), clavinet (4), synthesizer (5), Wurlitzer electric piano (7)
 Sturgill Simpson - background vocals (2), hand claps (8)
 Bobby Wood - Wurlitzer electric piano (3, 8), piano (7, 8), Hammond B-3 organ (8), harmonium (9)

Technical
 Daniel Bacigalupi - assistant
 David R. Ferguson - producer, engineer, mixing
 Pete Lyman - mastering
 Señora May - photography
 Colonel Tony Moore - illustration
 Sturgill Simpson - producer
 Sean Sullivan - engineer
 Jimbo Valentine - album layout

Charts

Weekly charts

Year-end charts

Certifications

References

2019 albums
Tyler Childers albums
RCA Records albums